SE5 may refer to:
 Ranggung LRT station, Singapore
 Royal Aircraft Factory S.E.5, a British fighter plane of the First World War
 SE5, a postcode district in the SE postcode area of London
 Sniper Elite 5, a video game
 Space Empires V, a video game